The 1985 Liberian coup d'état attempt was staged by General Thomas Quiwonkpa, who had been a leader of the 1980 coup along with President Samuel Doe and later founder of the National Patriotic Front of Liberia (NPFL). On 12 November 1985, one month after elections were held, Quiwonkpa, supported by about two dozen heavily armed men, covertly entered Liberia through Sierra Leone, and launched a coup against Doe. The coup resulted in a disastrous failure and Quiwonkpa was captured and on November 15 was killed and mutilated by Krahn soldiers loyal to Doe, who reportedly ate parts of his body.

Samuel Doe also announced in a radio and television broadcast that anyone found on the streets after a 6 p.m. curfew would be considered a rebel and executed immediately.

References

External links 
 Liberia – Election and Coup Attempt – 1985

1980s coups d'état and coup attempts
1985 in Liberia
Cold War rebellions
Conflicts in 1985
Military history of Liberia
November 1985 events in Africa
Incidents of cannibalism
Cannibalism in Africa